Gosder Cherilus (born June 28, 1984) is a former American football offensive tackle in the National Football League (NFL). He played college football at Boston College, and was drafted by the Detroit Lions 17th overall in the 2008 NFL Draft. Cherilus also played for the Indianapolis Colts and Tampa Bay Buccaneers.

Early years 
Cherilus played high school football at Somerville High School in Somerville, Massachusetts. Playing for Somerville head coaches Tony Gulla and Francis McCarthy, Cherilus earned All-State honors.

College career

2004 season 
Cherilus was the only redshirt freshman to start for the Eagles, lining up at right tackle for all 12 games and delivered six touchdown-resulting blocks and 46 knockdowns, he finished with an 80.1 percent grade for blocking consistency, as he paved the way for 100-yard rushing performances from L. V. Whitworth, Andre Callender and A. J. Brooks. He helped the Eagles to average 385.4 yards per game in total offense.

2005 season 
He started all 12 contests at right tackle during 2005 season, collecting 53 knockdowns with seven touchdown-resulting blocks . He worked well with right guard Josh Beekman, as the pair helped the Eagles lead the Atlantic Coast in total offense with 387.75 yards per game and rank third in passing with 242.75 yards per game. The Eagles offensive line was ranked twelfth in the nation, allowing only 15 sacks for losses totaling 91 yards.

2006 season 
In 2006, Cherilus started in all 13 games at right tackle and paved the way for seven 100-yard rushing games and a collective 1,424 rushing yards by L. V. Whitworth and Andre Callender. He helped the team average 114.5 yards per game on the ground and 355.6 yards in total offense, as the front wall allowed only 22 sacks for the season. He was graded 78.77 percent for blocking consistency while collecting 79 knockdowns along with 10 touchdown-resulting blocks. He played at the 2006 Meineke Car Care Bowl win over Navy.

2007 season 
He was named all-ACC second-team selection and recipient of the team’s Unsung Hero Award, Cherilus started 14 games at left tackle, helping BC rank seventh in the nation with an average of 323.9 yards per game passing, he registered 77 knockdowns with twelve touchdown-resulting blocks, finishing with a 78.0 percent grade for blocking consistency and also helped hold opponents to only 61 tackles-for-loss (fifth in the nation) and 22 sacks.

He served as team captain, along with Nick Larkin, Jo-Lonn Dunbar and Matt Ryan, who was also selected in the first round; third overall to Atlanta Falcons of the 2008 NFL Draft . He was part of an offensive line that helped support Ryan in his record-setting season including a career-high five touchdown passes vs. Wake Forest and pave the way for the Eagles 5,924 yards in total offense. He started in the victory over Michigan State Spartans in the 2007 Champs Sports Bowl and in the 2007 ACC Championship game loss vs Virginia Tech. Cherilus started a school-record 51 straight games.

Professional career

Detroit Lions 
As a rookie, Cherilus became a starter in the offensive line in his third game in the league replacing George Foster, and held that position for most of the 2008 season.

Indianapolis Colts 
On March 12, 2013, Cherilus signed a five-year, $35 million with the Indianapolis Colts. Upon signing his contract with the Colts, Gosder was the highest paid right tackle in the NFL at that time. He played the RT position opposite LT Anthony Castonzo. In 2013, he started all 16 games and started in the Colts' 2 postseason games. In 2014, Cherilus started 13 games, including his 100th career start in week 15. He missed the final two weeks of the regular season due to injury, and was placed on season-ending injured reserve on December 31, which is New Year's Eve.

On July 26, 2015, Cherilus was released by the Colts, two years into his five-year contract, having started 29 games.

Tampa Bay Buccaneers 
On August 17, 2015, Cherilus signed a two-year contract with the Tampa Bay Buccaneers.

During the 2015 season with the Tampa Bay Buccaneers, Gosder played in 13 games assisting the team in winning over five of them. In the 2016 season, Gosder played in 14 games starting in 3 of them. 

On March 16, 2017, Cherilus announced his retirement from the NFL.

References

External links 

Boston College Eagles bio
Detroit Lions bio
NFL Draft Bio
Gosder Cherilus Foundation

1984 births
Living people
American football offensive tackles
Boston College Eagles football players
Detroit Lions players
Indianapolis Colts players
Tampa Bay Buccaneers players
Haitian emigrants to the United States
Haitian players of American football
Players of American football from Massachusetts
Sportspeople from Somerville, Massachusetts